Operation Kipion is a long-standing maritime presence by the United Kingdom in the Persian Gulf and Indian Ocean to promote enduring peace and stability in the region, and ensure the safe flow of oil and trade.  Up until the early 2020s, a permanent presence of 4 minesweepers formed the Mine Countermeasures element (9 Mine Countermeasures Squadron) of this tasking. With the gradual withdrawal of the Sandown class minehunters in the Royal Navy, and their planned replaced with autonomous minehunting systems, the configuration of 9 Mine Countermeasures Squadron is likely to change. The Royal Air Force operations in the broader Middle East also fall under this operation.

Assets as of 2023

   with a AgustaWestland Wildcat HMA2 from 815 Naval Air Squadron (815 NAS) on board - (December 2022 – Present)
  (June 2022 – present)
 Mine Countermeasures Vessels
HMS Bangor
 
 

Historical:

  with a AgustaWestland Wildcat HMA2 from 815 Naval Air Squadron (815 NAS) on board - (September 2016 - April 2017)
  with a Westland Lynx HMA.8 from 815 Naval Air Squadron (815 NAS) on board - (January 2015 - June 2015)
  with a AgustaWestland Wildcat HMA2 from 815 Naval Air Squadron (815 NAS) on board - (September 2018 - April 2019)
  with a Westland Lynx HMA.8 from 815 Naval Air Squadron (815 NAS) on board - (October 2014 - December 2014) and (December 2015 and July 2016). With a AgustaWestland Wildcat HMA2 from 815 Naval Air Squadron (815 NAS) on board - (August 2019 - March 2020)
  with a Westland Lynx HMA.8 from 815 Naval Air Squadron (815 NAS) on board - (March 2015 - December 2015). With a AgustaWestland Wildcat HMA2 from 815 Naval Air Squadron (815 NAS) on board - (July 2019 - August 2019)
  with a AgustaWestland Wildcat HMA2 from 815 Naval Air Squadron (815 NAS) on board - (March 2017 - December 2017)
  with a AgustaWestland Wildcat HMA2 from 815 Naval Air Squadron (815 NAS) on board - (August 2019 - December 2019)
   with a AgustaWestland Wildcat AH1 from 847 Naval Air Squadron (847 NAS) on board - (August 2019 - February 2020)
  with a AgustaWestland Wildcat HMA2 from 815 Naval Air Squadron (815 NAS) on board - (March 2020 - September 2020)
     with a Westland Wildcat HMA2 from 815 Naval Air Squadron (815 NAS) on board - (June 2017 - May 2021)
   with a AgustaWestland Wildcat HMA2 from 815 Naval Air Squadron (815 NAS) on board - (April 2019 – November 2022)
  (May 2021 – April 2022)

See also 

 Standing Royal Navy deployments

References

External links
 

Military operations involving the United Kingdom
Conflicts in 2014
Conflicts in 2015